Mohammadiyeh District is a district (bakhsh) in Alborz County, Qazvin Province, Iran. At the 2006 census, its population was 87,193, in 22,728 families.  The District has two cities: Mohammadiyeh and Bidestan. The District has two rural districts (dehestan): Hesar Kharvan Rural District, and Sharifabad Rural District.

References 

Districts of Qazvin Province
Alborz County